Soft Hands (translit.al-aydi al-nā'ima) is a 1963 Egyptian comedy film directed by Mahmoud Zulfikar. It is based on a play of the same name by Egyptian playwright Tawfiq al-Hakim (1953). The film features an ensemble cast that includes Sabah, Salah Zulfikar, Ahmed Mazhar, Mariam Fakhr Eddine and Laila Taher. Soft Hands was entered into the 14th Berlin International Film Festival. Soft Hands is a member of the Top 100 Egyptian films list.

The plot involves a formerly landed aristocrat dispossessed by the 1952 Egyptian Revolution. The plot follows the aristocrat's struggle coming to terms with the reality of needing to work for a living, after being stripped of all landownership. He meets a similarly jobless doctorate in the Arabic language, who similarly, is also not willing to accept a job below his stature. Both must adjust to the new social and political realities in a new Nasserite socialist Egypt.

Synopsis 
A former prince becomes jobless after the Egyptian Revolution of 1952, and he goes bankrupt with only his palace remains. He meets a young man, doctor Hammouda, who has a doctorate but is unemployed, and the doctor suggests to the prince that he take advantage of the palace by renting it furnished. The prince has two daughters who deny their existence because the eldest daughter has married a simple engineer and the youngest daughter sells her paintings. The doctor agrees with them that the son-in-law, whom the prince has not seen before, along with his widowed sister and her father, rent the palace, and his estrangement with his two daughters ends, and he works as a tourist guide and marries the widow, and also the doctor marries the youngest daughter.

Crew 
 Directed by: Mahmoud Zulfikar
 Story: Tawfiq Al-Hakim
 Screenplay and dialogue: Youssef Gohar
 Cinematography: Wadid Serry
 Editing: Fekry Rostom
 Music: Ali Ismael
 Production studio: The General Company for Arab Film Production
 Distribution: Al Sharq Films Distribution

Cast
Sabah as Karima Abdel Salam
 Salah Zulfikar as Doctor Hammouda
 Ahmed Mazhar as Prince Shawkat Helmy
 Mariam Fakhr Eddine as Princess Jehan Shawkat Helmy
 Laila Taher as Princess Mervat Shawkat Helmy
 Ahmed Khamis as Salem Abdel Salam
 Widad Hamdi as Zaza the wife of a livestock dealer
 Kamel Anwar as Lulu the livestock dealer
 Hussein Aser as Hag Abdel Salam
 Ahmed Luxer as Nabil Imad
 Abdul-Ghani Al-Najdi as Head of chefs
 Hussein Ismail as Zaghloul the Sofragi
 Muhammad Idris as Osman the Sofargi
 Anwar Madkour as Director of the Cinema Company
 Abdul Mohsen Selim as the executive of the cinema company
 Edmond Twima as owner of the record company
 Abbas Al-Dali as  basbousa seller
 Mutawa Owais as vegetable seller
 Tusson Moatamed  as Chicken Seller
 Saleh Al-Iskandarani as the seller of grilled corn
 Abdul Hamid Badawi as one of the owing 
 Muhammed Morgan
 Rashad Ibrahim

See also
 Top 100 Egyptian films
 Salah Zulfikar filmography
 List of Egyptian films of 1963
 List of Egyptian films of the 1960s

References

External links

1963 films
1963 comedy films
Egyptian films based on plays
Egyptian comedy films
1960s Arabic-language films
Films directed by Mahmoud Zulfikar